is a railway station on the Seibu Ikebukuro Line in Nerima, Tokyo, Japan, operated by the private railway operator Seibu Railway.

Lines
Only all-stations "Local" services stop at this station.

Station layout
Sakuradai Station consists of an elevated island platform serving two tracks.

Platforms

History
The station opened on July 10, 1936. It temporarily closed on 3 February 1945, reopening on 1 April 1948.

Station numbering was introduced on all Seibu Railway lines during fiscal 2012, with Sakuradai Station becoming "SI05".

Passenger statistics
In fiscal 2013, the station was the 59th busiest on the Seibu network with an average of 13,674 passengers daily.

The passenger figures for previous years are as shown below.

See also
 Sakuradai Station (Fukuoka), a station in Fukuoka with the same name

References

External links

 Sakuradai Station information (Seibu Railway)] 

Railway stations in Japan opened in 1936
Seibu Ikebukuro Line
Railway stations in Tokyo